The 1960–61 Auburn Tigers men's basketball team represented Auburn University in the 1960–61 college basketball season. The team's head coach was Joel Eaves, who was in his twelfth season at Auburn. The team played their home games at Auburn Sports Arena in Auburn, Alabama. They finished the season 15–7, 8–6 in SEC play.

References

Auburn Tigers men's basketball seasons
Auburn
Auburn Tigers
Auburn Tigers